Pontibacillus litoralis is a Gram-positive, moderately halophilic, facultatively anaerobic, endospore-forming and motile bacterium from the genus of Pontibacillus which has been isolated from the surface of the sea anemone Anthopleura xanthogrammica from the Naozhou Island in China.

References

 

Bacillaceae
Bacteria described in 2010